Ammalo ramsdeni is a moth of the family Erebidae first described by William Schaus in 1924. It is found on Cuba.

References

Moths described in 1924
Phaegopterina
Moths of the Caribbean
Endemic fauna of Cuba